Yelena Parkhomenko (born 11 September 1982) is a volleyball player from Azerbaijan. Parkhomenko has represented the Azerbaijan Volleyball national team at the Volleyball Women's World Cup in 2006 and 2014, in total she played 142 games at an international level. At a club level she has played for numerous teams in Azerbaijan, as well as in Italy, Thailand and Israel. She retired in 2016.

Her sister Oksana Kurt is also an international volleyball player.

Honours 
Azerbaijan Superleague: 2000/01; 2002/03; 2003/04; 2004/05

CEV Cup: 2001/02

Challenge Cup: 2011/12

References

External links
 

1982 births
Living people
Sportspeople from Baku
Azerbaijani women's volleyball players
Azerbaijani people of Ukrainian descent
Volleyball players at the 2015 European Games
European Games competitors for Azerbaijan